Ciara is an American singer and songwriter. Her first album, Goodies, was released on September 28, 2004, and three of its singles – "1, 2 Step", "Goodies", and "Oh" – reached the top three on the Billboard Hot 100. The album debuted at number three on the Billboard 200 chart, with first week sales of nearly 125,000 copies. The album has also sold over three million copies in the United States, and five million copies worldwide.

The song "1, 2 Step" from the album Goodies has received numerous awards, including both "Best Performed Songs in the ASCAP Repertory" and "Most Performed Songs" from the American Society of Composers, Authors and Publishers, "Best Collaboration" from the BET Awards, and "Best Dance Cut" from the Soul Train Lady of Soul Music Awards, and "Choice Music R&B/Hip Hop Track" from the Teen Choice Awards. Ciara has received nine nominations from the BET Awards, winning one of them. She has also received five nominations from the Grammy Awards, receiving one award for "Best Short-Form Music Video" for the song "Lose Control," a collaboration that she did with rapper Missy Elliott. She also won Billboard's "Woman of the Year" award in 2008.

American Music Awards
The American Music Awards is an annual awards ceremony created by Dick Clark in 1973. Ciara has received two nominations.

|-
|  || Ciara || Favorite Soul/R&B Female Artist || 
|-
|  || Ciara || Favorite Soul/R&B Female Artist ||

ASCAP Pop Music Awards
The ASCAP Pop Music Awards is an annual awards ceremony hosted by the American Society of Composers, Authors and Publishers. Ciara has received three awards from three nominations.

|-
| style="text-align:center;" rowspan="1"|2005
| style="text-align:center;" rowspan="2"| "Goodies"
| style="text-align:center;" rowspan="6"| Most Performed Songs || 
|-
| style="text-align:center;" rowspan="3"| 2006
| 
|-
| style="text-align:center;" rowspan="1"| "1, 2 Step"
|
|-
| style="text-align:center;" rowspan="1"|"Oh"
|
|-
| style="text-align:center;" rowspan="2"| 2007
| style="text-align:center;" rowspan="1"|"Like You"
|
|-
| style="text-align:center;" rowspan="1"|"So What"
| 
|-
|}

ASCAP Rhythm & Soul Music Awards
Ciara has received seven awards.

|-
| 2005 || "Goodies" || Award Winning R&B/Hip-Hop Songs || 
|-
| 2006 || "1, 2 Step", "Like You" and "Oh" || Award Winning R&B/Hip-Hop Songs || 
|-
| 2007 || "So What" || Award Winning R&B/Hip-Hop Songs || 
|-
| 2008 || "Promise" || Award Winning R&B/Hip-Hop Songs || 
|-
| 2011 || "Ride" || Award Winning R&B/Hip-Hop Songs || 
|-
| 2014 || "Body Party" || Award Winning R&B/Hip-Hop Songs || 
|-
| 2016 || "I Bet" || Award Winning R&B/Hip-Hop Songs ||

BET Awards
The BET Awards were established in 2001 by BET. Ciara has received two awards from fourteen nominations.

|-
|rowspan="4"| 2005 ||rowspan="2"| "1, 2 Step" || Best Collaboration || 
|-
| Viewer's Choice || 
|-
|rowspan="2"| Ciara || Best Female R&B Artist || 
|-
| Best New Artist || 
|-
|rowspan="2"| 2006 || "Like You" || Best Collaboration || 
|-
| "Lose Control" || Video of the Year || 
|-
|rowspan="3"| 2007 || Ciara || Best Female R&B Artist || 
|-
| "Like a Boy" || Video of the Year || 
|-
| "Promise" || Viewer's Choice || 
|-
|rowspan="1"|2013 || Ciara || Best Smile || 
|-
|rowspan="1"|2015 || Ciara || Best R&B/Pop Female || 
|-
|rowspan="1"|2019 || Level Up || BET HER Award || 
|-
|rowspan="1"|2020 || Melanin || BET HER Award || 
|-
|rowspan="1"|2021 || Rooted || BET HER Award ||

Billboard AURN R&B/Hip-Hop Awards

|-
|rowspan="2"| 2005 || Ciara || Top R&B/Hip-hop Artist – Female || 
|-
| Ciara || Top R&B/Hip-hop Artist – New ||

Billboard Music Awards

|-
|rowspan="2"| 2004 || Ciara || Female New Artist of the Year || 
|-
| Ciara || Female R&B/Hip-Hop Artist of the Year || 
|-
|rowspan="2"| 2005 || Ciara || Female R&B/Hip-Hop Artist of the Year || 
|-
| "1,2 Step || Ringtone Of The Year || 
|-
|rowspan="2"| 2008 || Ciara || Woman of the Year || 
|-

Dirty Awards

|-
|rowspan="2"| 2005 || Ciara || Best R&B Female || 
|-
| Ciara || Best New Dirty Artist ||

ECHO Awards

|-
| 2006 || Ciara || International Hip-Hop/R&B Artist ||

Give Her FlowHERS Awards
The Give Her FlowHERS Awards is an award gala hosted by Femme It Forward that honors women in music.

|-
| 2022 || Ciara and Russell Wilson ||The Black Love Award ||

Grammy Awards
The Grammy Awards are awarded annually by the National Academy of Recording Arts and Sciences of the United States. Ciara has received one award from five nominations.

|-
|rowspan="4"| 2006 || Ciara || Best New Artist || 
|-
| "1, 2 Step" || Best Rap/Sung Collaboration || 
|-
|rowspan="2"| "Lose Control" (with Missy Elliott & Fatman Scoop) || Best Rap Song || 
|-
| Best Short-Form Music Video || 
|-
|rowspan="1"| 2010 || "Love Sex Magic" (feat. Justin Timberlake) || Best Pop Collaboration With Vocals ||

International Dance Music Awards

|-
| 2005 || "Goodies" || Best R&B/Urban Dance Track ||

MOBO Awards
The MOBO Awards is an awards ceremony established in 1995 by Kanya King. Ciara has received three nominations. The Daily Telegraph

|-
| 2005 || "Lose Control" (with Missy Elliott & Fatman Scoop) || Best Video || 
|-
|rowspan="1"| 2005 || Ciara || Best R&B Act || 
|-
|rowspan="2"| 2009 || Ciara || Best R&B Act || 
|-
| Ciara || Best International Act||

MuchMusic Video Awards

|-
|2005 || "1,2 Step" || Best International Video – Artist ||

MTV European Music Awards

|-
|2009 || Ciara || Best Urban||

MTV Video Music Awards
The MTV Video Music Awards is an annual awards ceremony established in 1984 by MTV. Ciara has received nine nominations and two wins so far.

|-
| rowspan="6"| 2005 ||rowspan="2"| "1, 2 Step" || Best Dance Video || 
|-
| Best New Artist || 
|-
| "Oh" || Best R&B Video || 
|-
| rowspan="3"| "Lose Control" || Best Dance Video || 
|-
| Best Hip-Hop Video || 
|-
| Breakthrough Video || 
|-
| 2007 || "Like a Boy" || Best Choreography || 
|-
| 2009 || "Love Sex Magic" || Best Choreography || 
|-
| 2013 || "Body Party" || Best Choreography ||

MTV Video Music Awards Japan

|-
|2007 || "Promise" || Best R&B Video||

Nickelodeon Kids' Choice Awards
The Nickelodeon Kids' Choice Awards is an annual awards show organized by Nickelodeon. Ciara has received two nominations.

|-
| 2006 || "1, 2 Step" || Favorite Song || 
|-
| 2007 || Ciara || Favorite Female Singer ||

Ozone Awards
The Ozone Awards is an annual awards ceremony hosted by Ozone Magazine. Ciara has received one award.

|-
| 2007 || Ciara || Best Female R&B Artist ||

People's Choice Awards

|-
| 2014 || Ciara || Favorite R&B Artist || 
|-
| 2016 || Ciara || Favorite R&B Artist ||

Radio Music Awards

|-
|rowspan="4"| 2005 || rowspan="2"| Ciara || Artist of the Year/ Mainstream Hit Radio || 
|-
| Artist of the Year/Urban and Rhythmic Radio || 
|-
| rowspan="2"| "1,2 Step" || Song of the Year/Mainstream Hit Radio || 
|-
| Song of the Year/Urban and Rhythmic Radio ||

Soul Train Music Awards
The Soul Train Music Awards is an annual awards show that honors black musicians and entertainers. Ciara has received seven awards from ten nominations.

|- 
|rowspan="5"| 2005 ||rowspan="5"| Ciara || Best R&B/Soul Album: Female || 
|-
| Best R&B/Soul Single: Female || 
|-
| Best R&B/Soul or Rap Dance Cut || 
|-
| Best R&B/Soul or Rap New Artist || 
|-
| Sammy Davis Junior Female Entertainer of the Year || 
|-
|rowspan="2"| 2006 ||rowspan="2"| Lose Control || Best R&B/Soul or Rap Music Video || 
|-
| Best R&B/Soul or Rap Dance Cut || 
|-
| 2010 || Ride || Best Dance Performance || 
|-
| 2013 || Body Party || Best Dance Performance || 
|-
| 2018 || Level Up || Best Dance Performance || 
|-
| 2019 || Ciara || Soul Train Certified Award ||

Teen Choice Awards
The Teen Choice Awards is an awards show presented annually by the Fox Broadcasting Company. Ciara has received two awards from three nominations.

|-
|rowspan="2"| 2005 || "Oh" || Choice Music Make-Out Song || 
|-
| "1, 2 Step" || Choice Music R&B/Hip Hop Track || 
|-
|rowspan="1"| 2009 || "Love Sex Magic" || Best Hook-Up Song ||

Vibe Awards
The Vibe Awards were an annual awards ceremony from 2003-2007 hosted by Vibe on UPN for four years and VH1 Soul in its last. Ciara received one award.

|-
|rowspan="5"| 2005 || "Oh" || Coolest Collabo || 
|-
|rowspan="2"| Ciara || Vibe Vixen || 
|-
| Artist Of The Year|| 
|-
| "Lose Control" || Reelest Video || 
|-
| "Like You"" || Coolest Collabo ||

World Music Awards

|-
|rowspan="2"| 2005 || Ciara || World's Best Selling R&B Artist|| 
|-
| Ciara || World's Best Selling New Female Artist|| 
|-
|2007 || Ciara || World's Best Selling R&B Female Artist || 
|-
|rowspan="5"| 2014 || Ciara || Best Song "Body Party"|| 
|-
| Ciara || Best Song "I'm Out"|| 
|-
| Ciara || Best Video "Body Party"|| 
|-
| Ciara || Best Video "I'm Out"|| 
|-
| Ciara || Best Album "Ciara"||

References

External links
 Ciara's official site

Awards and nominations
Ciara